Medleromyia is a genus of crane fly in the family Limoniidae.

Distribution
Nigeria.

Species
M. destituta Alexander, 1976
M. nigeriana Alexander, 1974

References

Limoniidae
Nematocera genera
Diptera of Africa